Timex Group B.V., or Timex Group, is an American - Dutch holding company headquartered in Hoofddorp, the Netherlands and  Middlebury, Connecticut. It is the corporate parent of several global watchmaking companies including Timex Group USA, Inc., TMX Philippines, Inc., and Timex Group India Ltd.

Corporate structure
The Timex Group itself is privately held by the Norwegian holding group Fred. Olsen & Co. and releases no data on its sales or production. Businesses and exclusive worldwide licenses include the Timex Business Unit (Timex, Timex Ironman, Opex, Nautica), Timex Group Luxury Watches (Valentino, Salvatore Ferragamo), Sequel (Guess, Gc), Vertime (Versace, Versus) and Giorgio Galli Design Lab.

Production
Timex Group B.V.'s products are manufactured in the Philippines, Hong Kong, China, France, India and Switzerland, often based on technology that continues to be developed in the United States and in Germany. The group has operations in a number of countries in Europe, the Americas, Asia and Oceania.

Name
Shortly after purchasing the Waterbury Clock Company in 1941, founder Thomas Olsen renamed the company Timex, as a portmanteau of Time (referring to Time magazine) and Kleenex.

Companies and brands 

Timex Business Unit, A division of Timex Group USA, Inc.
 Timex
 Opex
 Nautica
 TX Watch Company (2006-2011)

Sequel AG
 Guess
 Gc

Vertime SA
 Versace
 Versus

Timex Group Luxury Watches
 Salvatore Ferragamo Timepieces
 Valentino Timeless - no longer licensed
 Vincent Bérard (2006-2010)

Giorgio Galli Design Lab (Design studio, acquired 2007)
Galli designs watches for:
 Timex
 Nautica
 Versace
 Versus
 Salvatore Ferragamo

References

External links
 
 Timex brand website

 
Watchmaking conglomerates